Tongyang or Tong Yang may refer to:
 Tongyang Group, South Korean conglomerate
 Tongyang Confectionery, former name of Orion Confectionery, South Korean company formerly owned by the Tongyang Group
 Tongyang Daegu Orions, former name of Goyang Orions, South Korean basketball team formerly owned by the Tongyang Group
 Tongyang Broadcasting Company, South Korean television station owned by Samsung founder Lee Byung-chul
 Tongyang Cup, international Go competition
 Tong Yang Moolsan, South Korean tractor manufacturer
 Tongyang, Hubei (通羊镇), town in and the seat of Tongshan County, Hubei, China
 Tongyang, Jiangsu (潼阳镇), town in Shuyang County, Jiangsu, China